Yugoslavia sent a delegation to compete at the 1984 Winter Paralympics, in Innsbruck, Austria.

Yugoslavia finished 13th in the gold medal and in the total medal count.

Medalists

Classification
Each event had separate standing, sitting, or visually impaired classifications:

LW2 - standing: single leg amputation above the knee
LW 3 - standing: double leg amputation below the knee, mild cerebral palsy, or equivalent impairment
LW4 - standing: single leg amputation below the knee
LW5/7 - standing: double arm amputation
LW6/8 - standing: single arm amputation
LW9 - standing: amputation or equivalent impairment of one arm and one leg
B1 - visually impaired: no functional vision
B2 - visually impaired: up to ca 3-5% functional vision

Alpine skiing

Men

See also
Yugoslavia at the 1984 Winter Olympics
Yugoslavia at the Paralympics

References

 

 
Athlete Search Results - YUG -1984 PWG, International Paralympic Committee (IPC)

Nations at the 1984 Winter Paralympics
1984
Paralympics